Cephenothrips is a genus of thrips in the family Phlaeothripidae.

Species
 †Cephenothrips laticeps

References

Phlaeothripidae
Thrips
Thrips genera